Tea for the Tillerman is the fourth studio album by singer-songwriter Cat Stevens, released in November 1970.

Overview
Stevens' second album released during the year 1970, Tea for the Tillerman includes many of his best-known songs such as "Where Do the Children Play?", "Hard Headed Woman", "Wild World", "Sad Lisa", "Into White", and "Father and Son".

Stevens, a former art student, created the artwork featured on the record's cover.

With "Wild World" as an advance single, this was the album that brought Stevens worldwide fame. The album itself charted into the top 10 in the United States.

In November 2008, a "Deluxe Edition" was released featuring a second disc of demos and live recordings. In January 2012, a hi-res 24/192 kHz version was remastered using an Ampex ATR100 and a MSB Technology Studio ADC and released on HDtracks.com.

Fifty years after the original album's release, in September 2020, Stevens remade the album as Tea for the Tillerman2, including new lyrics and new instrumentation, and he sings along with his 22-year-old self in "Father and Son". That same year, Tea for the Tillerman was re-released as a 50th Anniversary Super Deluxe Edition. Along with five discs, the Super Deluxe Edition also includes a Blu-ray containing music videos, live videos, and audio of the 2020 mixes of the original album, as well as a 12" vinyl record of live recordings by Stevens at the Troubadour.

Critical reception 

In a contemporary review for The Village Voice, music critic Robert Christgau found the music monotonous and lacking the "dry delicacy" Stevens exhibited on Mona Bone Jakon (1970). Rolling Stone magazine's Ben Gerson said that Stevens' songs effortlessly resonate beyond their artfully simple lyrics and hooks, despite his occasional overuse of dynamics "for dramatic effect."

In a retrospective five-star review, AllMusic's William Ruhlmann praised Stevens' themes of spirituality and transcendence, and felt that he had continued to show his ability as a pop melodicist: "As a result, Tea for the Tillerman became a big seller and, for the second time in four years, its creator became a pop star." On 18 November 2003, Rolling Stone included this album in its 500 Greatest Albums of All Time list at number 206, number 208 in a 2012 revised list, and currently at number 205 on its latest list published in 2020. In 2006, the album was included in the book 1001 Albums You Must Hear Before You Die. In 2007, the album was included in the list of "The Definitive 200 Albums of All Time", released by The National Association of Recording Merchandisers and the Rock and Roll Hall of Fame.  It was voted number 342 in Colin Larkin's All Time Top 1000 Albums.

Track listing
All songs were written by Cat Stevens.

Original release

Deluxe Edition

Disc one
Original album.

Disc two

Super Deluxe Edition

Discs one, two and three
The first disc on the Super Deluxe Edition contains 2020 remasters of the original album; the second disc contains 2020 mixes of the original album; and the third disc contains Tea for the Tillerman2.

Disc four

Disc five

Re-recording
On 28 May 2020, Yusuf announced his new album, Tea for the Tillerman2, which was released on 18 September 2020. Tea for the Tillerman2 is a reimagining of "the same eleven songs for a new age with dramatic results", celebrating the 50th anniversary of Tea for the Tillerman.

Personnel
 Cat Stevens – classical guitar, acoustic guitar, keyboards, lead vocals
 Alun Davies – acoustic guitar, backing vocals
 Harvey Burns – drums, congas, tambourine
 John Ryan – double bass
 Del Newman – string arrangements
 Jack Rothstein (as John Rostein) – solo violin
Technical
Cat Stevens - front cover illustration 
Shepard "Shep" Sherbell - photography

Charts

Weekly charts

Year-end charts

Certifications

In popular culture
The closing title track of the British sitcom Extras is "Tea for the Tillerman", which is written and performed by Cat Stevens and is the title track of his album Tea for the Tillerman.

The opening scene to a 2014 episode of The Simpsons titled "Super Franchise Me" parodied the artwork to this album, with the title track playing over it.

A previously unreleased version of "But I Might Die Tonight", was used in the 1970 film Deep End in the opening and closing scenes. The version of the song used in the film was eventually released in 2020.

Four of the songs from this album were used in the 1971 film Harold and Maude: "Tea for the Tillerman"; "Where Do the Children Play"; "Miles from Nowhere" and "On the Road to Find Out".

The song "Father and Son", was used in the closing scene of the 2017 film Guardians of the Galaxy Vol. 2. The song is also featured in the 2009 film The Boat That Rocked.

References

Cat Stevens albums
1970 albums
Albums produced by Paul Samwell-Smith
Island Records albums
A&M Records albums
Albums recorded at Morgan Sound Studios
Albums recorded at Olympic Sound Studios